Nerekhta is a town in Kostroma Oblast, Russia. Population:

History
The first historical record of the town is in the records of Pereslavl-Suzdal Monastery in 1214. The town does not retain many marks of antiquity, apart from several 17th-century churches. It has been known for its textiles since the 19th century.

Etymology 
The town is named after a river on which it's located. There are several other rivers named Nerekhta in central Russia, and this hydronym is believed to come from a substrate Finno-Ugric language (cf.  'cape, foreland'). The reconstruction *(i)ne-(j)еr-еxta ('river of a big lake') is viewed by Aleksandr Matveyev as unconvincing, since there are no big lakes within the basins of any rivers named Nerekhta.

Administrative and municipal status
Within the framework of administrative divisions, Nerekhta serves as the administrative center of Nerekhtsky District, even though it is not a part of it. As an administrative division, it is incorporated separately as the town of oblast significance of Nerekhta—an administrative unit with a status equal to that of the districts. As a municipal division, the town of oblast significance of Nerekhta is incorporated within Nerekhtsky Municipal District as Nerekhta Urban Settlement.

Transportation
Railway lines connect the town to Yaroslavl, Kostroma, and Ivanovo.

Sports
The bandy club Start plays in a recreational league. It will participate in the Russian Rink Bandy Cup 2017.

See also
Kryakutnoy

References

Notes

Sources

External links
Official website of Nerekhta 
Nerekhta directory of organizations 

Cities and towns in Kostroma Oblast
Nerekhtsky Uyezd